Siwakorn Wongpin (born 29 July 1999) is a Thai rower. He competed in the 2020 Summer Olympics.

References

1999 births
Living people
Rowers at the 2020 Summer Olympics
Siwakorn Wongpin
Siwakorn Wongpin